Of Cash and Hash is a 1955 short subject directed by Jules White starring American slapstick comedy team The Three Stooges (Moe Howard, Larry Fine and Shemp Howard). It is the 160th entry in the series released by Columbia Pictures starring the comedians, who released 190 shorts for the studio between 1934 and 1959.

Plot
The Stooges are mistaken for three armored car thieves after getting caught in crossfire. Captain Mullin (Vernon Dent) gives the boys a lie detector test, but finds no reason to hold them. He releases them, and they return to work at their restaurant, the Elite Café. Friend Gladys Harmon (Christine McIntyre) stops by the restaurant just as one of the real armored car bandits flees the scene. They then chase the bandit to a spooky old mansion where they and their hideous hatchet man, Angel (Duke York), are hiding. When the mob abducts Gladys, the Stooges come to her rescue and retrieve the stolen money.

Cast

Credited
 Moe Howard as Moe
 Larry Fine as Larry
 Shemp Howard as Shemp
 Christine McIntyre as Gladys Harmon (final film)
 Vernon Dent as Captain Mullins (Stock footage)
 Kenneth MacDonald as Lefty Loomis
 Frank Lackteen as Red Watkins

Uncredited
 Joe Palma as Armored car guard
 Palma as lie detector technician (Stock footage)
 Tommy Kingston as second Armored car guard
 Cy Schindell as Officer Jackson (Stock footage)
 Blackie Whiteford as second policeman (Stock footage)
 Stanley Blystone as Elite Café customer (final film)
 Duke York as Angel (Stock footage)

Production notes
Of Cash and Hash is a remake of 1948's Shivering Sherlocks, using ample recycled footage from the original. New footage was filmed on April 26, 1954.

This was the final film featuring new footage of long-time Stooge character actress Christine McIntyre. She would appear in six additional Stooge films via stock footage. It also was the final Three Stooges film featuring long-time Columbia supporting actor Stanley Blystone and long-time villainous actor Frank Lackteen.

See also
List of American films of 1955

References

External links 
 
 
Of Cash and Hash at threestooges.net

1955 films
1955 comedy films
The Three Stooges films
American black-and-white films
The Three Stooges film remakes
Films directed by Jules White
Columbia Pictures short films
1950s English-language films
1950s American films
American comedy short films